Ángel Javier Hernández Pindado (born 24 April 1976) is a Spanish former footballer who played as a goalkeeper, currently a goalkeeping coach.

He appeared in 92 Segunda División matches over six seasons, mainly at the service of Las Palmas. He also competed professionally in Belgium, Cyprus and Albania, in a 17-year career.

Playing career
Pindado was born in Ávila, Castile and León. During his early career he represented Águilas CF, Granada CF, Atlético Madrid B, Getafe CF, Albacete Balompié and UD Las Palmas, also having an unassuming abroad spell with Belgium's Royal Antwerp F.C. in the 2003–04 season (one appearance, relegation from the First Division as last).

On 29 May 2005, in the closing round of the top-division campaign, Pindado played his only game in La Liga as Albacete were already relegated, a 1–0 away loss against Racing de Santander. With Las Palmas, he was the undisputed starter as the Canary Islands club was in the Segunda División B, but featured less in Segunda División; he did contribute 22 appearances in 2009–10, as Fabián Assmann dealt with some injury problems.

After only five competitive matches in the 2010–11 season where he conceded 18 goals, the 35-year-old Pindado was released by Las Palmas. He joined Nea Salamis Famagusta FC of Cyprus in the 2012 winter transfer window.

In January 2014, after nearly two years with his hometown side, Pindado signed with KS Kastrioti as a player–goalkeeping coach, becoming the first Spaniard in both capacities to compete in the Albanian Superliga.

Coaching career
Pindado retired in June 2014 at the age of 38, immediately joining compatriot José Murcia's staff at PFC Levski Sofia. He subsequently worked as goalkeeper coach in Thailand (Ubon United FC, under Scott Cooper) and the Indian Super League (FC Pune City, ATK and ATK Mohun Bagan FC, always under his compatriot Antonio López Habas).

References

External links

1976 births
Living people
People from Ávila, Spain
Sportspeople from the Province of Ávila
Spanish footballers
Footballers from Castile and León
Association football goalkeepers
La Liga players
Segunda División players
Segunda División B players
Tercera División players
Águilas CF players
Granada CF footballers
Atlético Madrid B players
Getafe CF footballers
Albacete Balompié players
UD Las Palmas players
Real Ávila CF players
Belgian Pro League players
Royal Antwerp F.C. players
Cypriot First Division players
Nea Salamis Famagusta FC players
Kategoria Superiore players
KS Kastrioti players
Spanish expatriate footballers
Expatriate footballers in Belgium
Expatriate footballers in Cyprus
Expatriate footballers in Albania
Spanish expatriate sportspeople in Belgium
Spanish expatriate sportspeople in Cyprus
Spanish expatriate sportspeople in Albania
Spanish expatriate sportspeople in Bulgaria
Spanish expatriate sportspeople in Thailand
Spanish expatriate sportspeople in India
Spanish expatriate sportspeople in Qatar
Association football goalkeeping coaches